The Curling Club Utrecht is the second biggest curling club in the Netherlands.
It is located in Utrecht and is home to the Praxis Hammerheads.

External links
http://www.curlingclubutrecht.nl/
http://www.hammerheads.nl

Curling clubs in the Netherlands
Sports clubs in Utrecht (city)